Stadtallendorf station is a through station at the 82.1 km mark of the Main-Weser Railway in the town of  Stadtallendorf in the German state of Hesse. The station is classified by Deutsche Bahn (DB) as a category 4 station. The platforms, underpass and the area around the station were modernised and redecorated in preparation for the Hessentag (Hesse Day) celebrations of 2010.

History
The station was opened along with the Main-Weser Railway in 1850 as Haltepunkt Allendorf (Allendorf halt). This consisted of a gatehouse and two 100 metre long platforms. In 1904, a 600 meter long passing loop was built, the platforms were extended, and it was reclassified as a station. In addition, two platform tracks, a freight shed, loading ramps and a loading road were built. A short time later, in 1908, the station building was opened and a second passing loop was built in the First World War. By 1934, the loading facilities were expanded and the rail tracks were rebuilt.

During the Second World War the Allendorf explosives factories of Dynamit Nobel and WASAG were built and they were connected to the station with a total of 39 kilometres of track and 97 sets of points. As a result, the station was greatly expanded (ten new tracks) and provided with two signal boxes. In addition, the level crossing was removed and replaced by a pedestrian underpass, which still exists. In 1942, a connecting track was opened to the Kirtorf airfield, but this was closed in 1947. After the war, production was stopped in the explosives factories and the damaged rail wagons were scrapped. The sidings continued to be used (and sometimes they still are) by local companies and the Herrenwald barracks.

In 1959, the station was served by two express and 31 ordinary passenger trains a day. 106,000 tickets were sold in the same year. After 1961, the superstructure of the railway sidings was renewed and their operations, which were previously operated by Aufbaugesellschaft Allendorf, were then taken over by Deutsche Bundesbahn. Then, in 1964 the tracks in the station area were electrified and a modern waiting hall with a ticket office was installed in the entrance building. Electrical operations began in 1966, and a year later a complete renovation of the entrance building began. In 1969, 145,000 tickets were sold. With the reorganisation of freight operations, the station managed general freight operations at Neustadt and twelve other places. In 1975, general freight operations were transferred completely to Marburg.

During 1978, 104,566 tickets were sold, but sales fell to 58,004 in 1983. In 1984, the main station office was closed. There were extensive changes in the 1988 timetable: twelve D-Zug express train connections were cancelled, but the number of semi-fast trains increased from 19 to 26. The newly introduced InterRegio services ran non-stop through the station. In 1994, the express and local trains were replaced by Regionalbahn and Regional-Express trains, so the station lost all long-distance services. After the Rhein-Main-Verkehrsverbund (Rhine-Main Transport Association, RMV) was established in 1995, and launched in 1997, the railway postal traffic was abandoned completely. The station building has not been used since the closure of the ticket office and the waiting room on 30 June 2001. Tickets can now be purchased only from travel agents and ticket machines. In December 2006, the Mittelhessen-Express was introduced, running hourly between Frankfurt and Treysa. The complete rebuilding of the station area and the city centre began in 2009.

Conversion for the Hessentag 

The town of Stadtallendorf was the site of the Hessentag (Hesse day) celebrations of 2010 and the station was rehabilitated and made accessible for the disabled with federal and state grants totalling €7.3 million. The groundbreaking ceremony took place on 17 July 2009 and work began the following day. A park and ride facility was built after Hessentag partly because its location was required for a Hessentag function. The restoration of the station was completed on 25 May 2010.

Entrance building
The station building was opened in 1908. A modern bus shelter with a ticket office was built in 1964 on the western side and the main station building was completely renovated in 1968.

Since June 2001 the station building has not been used as the waiting room and the ticket office has been closed. In 2009, a complete renovation of the station building began. The freight hall was demolished and the annex built in 1964 was converted into a bike parking station with 41 parking spaces and toilets. The main building now houses an apartment, a travel agency and a staff room for shunting staff.

Operations

Passengers
The station is located in the area of the Rhein-Main-Verkehrsverbund (Rhine-Main Transport Association, RMV) and is served at hourly intervals by the Mittelhessen-Express (RB 41). It runs between Treysa and Frankfurt (Main) Hauptbahnhof and is coupled with a train running from Dillenburg in Gießen. In Treysa it connects with line RT9 of the Kassel RegioTram to Kassel Hbf. The trip to Frankfurt takes 108 minutes, while the trip to Kassel, with a change, takes 63 minutes. Furthermore, there are direct Regional-Express services every two hours to Frankfurt and Kassel. The journey time to Frankfurt is 74 minutes and to Kassel is 51 minutes.

Freight
Freight transport in Stadtallendorf is dominated by the bulk traffic of the Fritz Winter foundry  which is supplied over the rail with quartz sand among other things. The extensive system of tracks is still mostly used for the shunting and parking of wagons. Since about 1980, the sidings have been closed.

Interlockings 
Stadtallendorf has had two signal boxes since the Second World War, which are still in use today. The mechanical interlocking Af is at the level of the platforms and is controlled by a dispatcher. Another mechanical interlocking, Ao, is located in the southeast of the station at the junction of the railway sidings.

Buses 

The Stadtallendorf bus station is about 100 metres south of the DB station. It is served by the following bus lines:
MR-85 (Schweinsberg–Niederklein–Marburg–Niederklein–Schweinsberg)
MR-90 (Wolferode–Hatzbach–Erksdorf–Hatzbach–Stadtallendorf)
91 (Stadtallendorf municipal buses)
92 (Stadtallendorf municipal buses)

The current bus station was opened in 2009, as the old one, built in the early 1980s, was replaced by a new shopping centre.

References

External links 

 

Railway stations in Hesse
Railway stations in Germany opened in 1850
Buildings and structures in Marburg-Biedenkopf